SpongeBob SquarePants Presents The Tidal Zone, referred to more simply as The Tidal Zone is an American animated anthology television special based on Nickelodeon’s SpongeBob SquarePants and its corresponding franchise, branded as the SpongeBob Universe. A parody and homage to horror anthology television programs, mainly The Twilight Zone, the special comprises five episodes, being the 12th episode of the thirteenth season of SpongeBob SquarePants, the first half of the fourteenth episode of The Patrick Star Show, and the second half of the twenty first episode of the first season of Kamp Koral: SpongeBob’s Under Years. The special was announced on July 22, 2022 at Nickelodeon’s San Diego Comic Con panel and premiered on January 13, 2023.

Premise
The Tidal Zone is a showcase of stories set in the SpongeBob Universe with a continuous theme of absurdist and abnormality, hosted by the French Narrator who provides the opening and closing narration of each segment. Throughout the special, GrandPat Star is using a time machine in the form of a closet to find his way back home and occasionally appears in each segment.

Cast

 Tom Kenny as SpongeBob, SpongeBot, Gary, Robo-Gary, French Narrator, Additional Voices
 Bill Fagerbakke as Patrick Star, Pat-Tron
 Rodger Bumpass as Squidward, SquidBot, Captain Doug Quasar, Demon, Additional Voices
 Carolyn Lawrence as Sandy Cheeks, Sandroid, Additional Voices
 Mr. Lawrence as Plankton, PlankBot, Rube, Rubedor, Robo-Larry, Additional Voices
 Clancy Brown as Mr. Krabs, RoboKrabs
 Jill Talley as Karen, Squidina Star 
 Thomas F. Wilson as Cecil Star 
 Cree Summer as Bunny Star 
 Dana Snyder as GrandPat Star 
 Patrick Pinney as Painty the Pirate

Episodes

Notes

Release
The special was announced at Nickelodeon’s San Diego Comic Con panel on July 22, 2022. It was originally scheduled to air on November 25, 2022, but it was delayed due to unknown reasons. On December 13, 2022 the special was rescheduled to January 13, 2023.

Reception
David King of BubbleBlabber.com called the special decent, saying that "It’s hard to believe a long-running franchise like this hasn’t had anything like this that isn’t a Halloween special. I give it points for creativity at least for “out-weirding” itself, and given the popularity that Spongebob has obtained for decades, I have the feeling we might get more of these in the future.”

References 

SpongeBob SquarePants
2023 television specials
2020s American animated television series
2020s American anthology television series
American children's animated anthology television series
2020s Nickelodeon original programming
SpongeBob SquarePants episodes
Fiction anthologies
Television crossover episodes
Parody television episodes